Stiglmaierplatz is a square in the Munich district of Maxvorstadt. It was named in 1845 after the artist Johann Baptist Stiglmaier and was previously the Kronprinzenplatz and since 1826 it was known as the Ludwigplatz.

Traffic 

Today, Stiglmaierplatz is crossed in a northwestern direction by Dachauer Straße; shortly before which the multi-lane traffic of Seidlstraße flows into it at the level of the tram train station to the south and ends here. From the east, Brienner Straße ends at Stiglmaierplatz and merges into Nymphenburger Straße to the west. Schleißheimer Straße begins in the northeast. The square can be reached by public transport via subway lines 1 and 7 and tram lines 20, 21 and 22.

History 

In the Middle Ages the square lay on a road leading from the Neuhauser Tor to Schleißheim and at the latest from the end of the 14th century served as a starting point for horse races on the so-called Rennweg, which ran where today's Schleißheimer Straße was built. From 1448 the races were held annually during the Jakobidult on the route from the Neuhauser Tor in the direction of Feldmoching, which was also known as the Rennweg until 1878. Not far north of today's Stiglmaierplatz, the country estate Wiesenfeld was located from the end of the 18th century.

References

External links 

 Stiglmaierplatz (Munich U-Bahn)
 U-Bahnhof Stiglmaierplatz

Buildings and structures in Munich
Historicist architecture in Munich
Squares in Munich